Highway 259 (AR 259, Ark. 259, and Hwy. 259) is a designation for three north–south state highways in northeast Arkansas. A southern route of  runs north from Highway 238 to US Route 70 (US 70) at Lake Grove, Arkansas. A second route of  begins at Highway 306 and runs north to Highway 284 in Cross County. A third route of  begins at Highway 364 and runs north to Highway 42 near Hickory Ridge.

Route description

AR 238 to Lake Grove

Highway 259 begins at Highway 238 west of Moro and runs north past a cemetery before turning east and meeting Highway 78 at South Plains. The two routes have a brief concurrency north before Highway 78 splits to the northwest and Highway 259 continues north. Shortly after this junction, Highway 259 serves as the southern terminus for Highway 261. The highway runs north through New Salem before entering St. Francis County, where it terminates at US 70.

AR 306 to AR 284
Highway 259 begins in the northwest corner of St. Francis County at Highway 306 and runs due north through flat farmland. The route runs into Cross County where it terminates at Highway 284. The highway does not cross or overlap with any other state highways and essentially serves as a connector route between two rural routes.

AR 364 to Hickory Ridge
Highway 259 begins at Highway 364 in eastern Cross County. The route runs north through farmland to Highway 42 in Hickory Ridge, where it terminates.

Major intersections
Mile markers reset at concurrences.

See also

 List of state highways in Arkansas

References

External links

259
Transportation in Cross County, Arkansas
Transportation in Lee County, Arkansas
Transportation in St. Francis County, Arkansas